Dacalana liaoi is a butterfly of the family Lycaenidae first described by Hisakazu Hayashi, Heinz G. Schroeder and Colin G. Treadaway in 1983. Its forewing length is 17–18 mm. The species is endemic to the Philippines and distributed on Panay and Negros islands. It is not a common species.

References

 , 1983: Neue Arten und Unterarten der Gattungen Dacalana und Pratapa von den Philippinen (Insecta: Lepidoptera: Lycaenidae).: Senckenbergiana Biologica. 63 (1/2): 47-59.
, 1995. Checklist of the butterflies of the Philippine Islands (Lepidoptera: Rhopalocera) Nachrichten des Entomologischen Vereins Apollo Suppl.14: 7-118.

 , 2012: Revised checklist of the butterflies of the Philippine Islands (Lepidoptera: Rhopalocera). Nachrichten des Entomologischen Vereins Apollo, Suppl. 20: 1-64.

Butterflies described in 1983
Dacalana